Donald Michael Campbell (April 9, 1926 – February 3, 2017) was an American sprinter. Campbell was born in Denver, Colorado on April 9, 1926. During World War II, he served in the Philippines as a rifleman in the U.S. Army. In June 1955, he married Shirley, in Boulder, Colorado. During his career in athletics, he was nicknamed the Colorado Comet. Campbell died in Santa Fe, New Mexico on February 3, 2017, at the age of 90. He was survived by his wife, one son and one daughter.

References

1926 births
2017 deaths
American male sprinters
Athletes (track and field) at the 1951 Pan American Games
Medalists at the 1951 Pan American Games
Pan American Games gold medalists for the United States
Pan American Games medalists in athletics (track and field)